The 2010 ATP Salzburg Indoors was a professional tennis tournament played on indoor hard courts. It was the second edition of the tournament which is part of the 2010 ATP Challenger Tour and the Tretorn SERIE+ series. It took place in Salzburg, Austria between 15 and 21 November 2010.

ATP entrants

Seeds

 Rankings are as of November 8, 2010.

Other entrants
The following players received wildcards into the singles main draw:
  Nikolaus Moser
  Thomas Muster
  Philipp Oswald
  Nicolas Reissig

The following player received a Special Exempt into the singles main draw:
  Matthias Bachinger

The following players received entry from the qualifying draw:
  Riccardo Ghedin
  Laurynas Grygelis
  Yann Marti
  Boris Pašanski

Champions

Singles

 Conor Niland def.  Jerzy Janowicz, 7–6(5), 6–7(2), 6–3

Doubles

 Alexander Peya /  Martin Slanar def.  Rameez Junaid /  Frank Moser, 7–6(1), 6–3

External links
Official Website
ITF Search 
ATP official site

ATP Salzburg Indoors
ATP Salzburg Indoors
2010 in Austrian tennis